Pelagia  is a village in the administrative district of Gmina Wodzierady, within Łask County, Łódź Voivodeship, in central Poland.

The village has a population of 50.

References

Villages in Łask County